Anambra State  is a Nigerian state, located in the southeastern region of the country. The state was created on 27 August 1991. Anambra state is bounded by Delta State to the west, Imo State to the south, Enugu State to the east and Kogi State to the north.

According to the 2022 census report, there are over 9 million residents in the state. The state name was formed in 1976 from the former East Central State. The state is named after Omambala River, a river that runs through the state. Anambra is the Anglicized name of the Omambala. The State capital is Awka, a rapidly growing city that increased in population from approximately 700,000 to more than 6 million between 2006 and 2020. The city of Onitsha, a historic port city from the pre-colonial era, remains an important centre of commerce within the state.

Nicknamed the "Light of the Nation", Anambra State is the eighth most populous state in the nation, although that has seriously been argued against as Onitsha, the state's biggest and most populous urban area was discovered to be over 8.5 million in population in 2020 by Africapolis which makes Onitsha the second largest urban area in Nigeria by population and third in Africa. And also According to the 2019 Demographia world urban areas Onitsha is the 47th largest built-up urban areas in the world with more than 8 million populations Anambra is a very populous state, despite being the second smallest in area. The area currently known as Anambra State has been the site of numerous civilizations since at least the 9th century AD, including the ancient Kingdom of Nri, whose capital was the historic town of Igbo-Ukwu within the state. Residents of Anambra State are primarily Igbo, with the Igbo language serving as a lingua franca throughout the state.

During the Nigerian Civil War (1967–1970), Anambra State was part of the secessionist Republic of Biafra formed by Igbo nationalists. During the war, Anambra State was afflicted by a severe famine, which devastated much of the population. Today, Anambra State is a highly urbanized state, and has made major strides in reducing its poverty rate.

Etymology 
The name Anambra is the merging of Anam and branch. Anam is a clan in the Omambala region and the last Igbo speaking community the British colonialists encountered while heading up to Northern Nigeria from across the riverine areas. They usually described present day Anambra as 'Anam branch' to their colleagues up North. Reason Anam together with some neighboring clans was Anambra LGA when the state was created. It is now Anambra-West LGA with Olumbanasa.

History 
Anambra's history stretches to the 9th century AD, as revealed by archaeological excavations at Igbo-Ukwu and Ezira. It has great works of art in iron, bronze, copper, and pottery. These have revealed a sophisticated divine Kingship administrative system, which held sway in the area of Anambra from c. 948 AD to 1911. In some towns, such as Ogidi and others, local families had hereditary rights to kingship for centuries.

Great Britain recognised some of these traditional kings and leaders in their system of indirect rule of the Protectorate of South Nigeria. Beginning in the 19th century, they appointed some noble leaders as Warrant Chiefs, authorizing them to collect taxes, among other duties.

Anambra is in the Igbo-dominated area that seceded as part of an independent Biafra in 1967, following rising tensions with Northern Nigeria. During the Nigerian/Biafran war (1967–1970), Biafran engineers constructed a relief airstrip in the town of Uli/Amorka (code named "Annabelle"). Extremely dangerous relief flights took off from Sao Tome and other sites loaded with tons of food and medicine for the distressed Biafran population. Uli/Amorka airstrip was the site where American pilots such as Alex Nicoll, and scores of others, delivered tons of relief supplies to the Biafran population.

Disgusted by the suffering and mounting death toll in Biafra from starvation, as well as the continuous harassment of the relief planes by the Nigerian Airforce, Carl Gustaf von Rosen resigned as a Red Cross relief pilot. He helped Biafra to form an airforce of five Minicoin planes Malmö MFI-9 stationed at the Uga airstrip. He named his tiny but effective air force "Babies of Biafra" in honour of the babies who died from starvation inside Biafra.

Old Anambra State was created in 1976 from part of East Central State, and its capital was Enugu. In 1991 a re-organisation divided Anambra into two states, Anambra and Enugu. The capital of Anambra is Awka.

Geography

Cities and administrative divisions 

With an annual population growth rate of 2.21 percent per annum, Anambra State has over 60% of its people living in urban areas. It is one of the most urbanized states in Nigeria.

The major urban centres of Anambra State are Onitsha, including Okpoko town, Ogbaru; Nnewi, and Awka, the state capital.  Awka and Onitsha had developed as pre-colonial urban centres: Awka was the craft industrial centre of the Nri hegemony. Onitsha is a city state on the Niger, having developed as a river port and commercial centre.

Onitsha is a fast-growing commercial city, and has developed to become a huge conurbation extending to Idemili, Oyi and Anambra East LGAs, with one of the largest markets in West Africa.

In 2012 the tri-city area was dubbed the Onitsha-Nnewi-Awka (ONA) Industrial Axis, in recognition of the expanding industrial capacity. Nnewi (sometimes called the Taiwan of Nigeria) is a rapidly developing industrial and commercial centre. Designated as the state capital, Awka has regained its precolonial administrative eminence.

Local government areas 

Anambra State consists of 21 local government areas. They are:

 Aguata
 Awka North
 Awka South
 Anambra East
 Anambra West
 Anaocha
 Ayamelum
 Dunukofia
 Ekwusigo
 Idemili North
 Idemili South
 Ihiala
 Njikoka
 Nnewi North
 Nnewi South
 Ogbaru
 Onitsha North
 Onitsha South
 Orumba North
 Orumba South
 Oyi

Location 
Boundaries are formed by Delta State to the west, Imo State and Rivers State to the south, Enugu State to the east, and Kogi State to the north. The name was derived from the Anambra River (Omambala) which flows through the area and is a tributary of the River Niger.

Anambra is the eighth-most populated state in the Federal Republic of Nigeria and the second-most densely populated state in Nigeria after Lagos State. The stretch of more than 45 km between the towns of Oba and Amorka contains a cluster of numerous thickly populated villages and small towns, giving the area an estimated average density of 1,500–2,000 persons per square kilometre.

IDP camps for flood victims 

Many internally displaced persons (IDP) have been set up in different locations in Anambra State to accommodate the flood victims who fled their homes for safety. About 27 Internally Displaced Persons camps have been provided by Anambra State government while flood victims provided emergency camps for themselves when the official camps cannot accommodate them.

Economy 

Agriculture is an important economic sector in Anambra. Oil palms, maize, rice, yams and cassava are among the crops grown. Fishing is also part of the economic mainstay of  Anambra State more especially for communities along the riverine areas.

Anambra houses the first Nigerian vehicle manufacturer, Innoson, an automobile manufacturer, located in Nnewi.

People all over West Africa travel to Onitsha to trade, which boost the internal revenue of the state, making it one of the top commercial towns in Africa.

Anambra is a home of innovation, inventions and creativity. There has been several innovations in Anambra, due to its appreciation of education, which has added to the state's GDP. One of those was in 2018, when two brothers, Atikpo Chukwuebuka and Ubaka Chukwuebuka, were the first to invent a machine, that could wash off the bitterness from bitter leaf (a highly nutritious vegetable). This machine will greatly improve the productivity of vegetable farming in the state.

The export of agricultural items is a continual boost to Anambra Internal Generated Revenue, as in 2017, $5 million was generated from the export of washed bitter leaf.

There is a huge deposit of oil and gas in Nigeria, with the Anambra Basin having a great potential of 1000 trillion cubic feet of gas reserves untapped. Having more than 13 oil wells situated in Anambra, Anambra state has the capacity to produce more than 100,000 barrels of crude oil per day, with indigenous companies like Orient Petroleum, and Sterling Oil Exploration and Production Co. LTD (SEEPCO), already leading the way.

Natural resources 
Anambra is rich in natural gas, crude oil, bauxite, and ceramic. It has an almost 100 percent arable soil.

Anambra state has many other resources in terms of agro-based activities such as fisheries and farming, as well as land cultivated for pasturing and animal husbandry.

Oil and gas 
In the year 2006, a foundation-laying ceremony for the first Nigerian private refinery, Orient Petroleum Refinery (OPR), was made at Aguleri area.

In 2012, following the efforts of Governor Peter Obi and other stakeholders of Orient Petroleum, Anambra State became an oil-producing state. The indigenous company struck oil in the Anambra River basin.

On 2 August 2015, the management of Orient Petroleum Resources Plc said the company planned to increase its crude oil production to 3,000 barrels per day by September 2015, as it stepped up production activities in two new oil wells in its Aguleri oil fields. An indigenous company, Nails and Stanley Ltd, was to establish a gas plant at Umueje in Ayamelum Local Government Area to support economic activities in the oil and gas industry in the state.

Infrastructure and urbanization 

Since the late 1990s, there has been a migration from rural to urban areas in the state, resulting in Anambra becoming a highly urbanized state: 62% of its population lives in urban areas. In October 2015, the APGA-led state government of Willie Obiano, signed a memorandum of understanding with Galway modular housing company, Affordable Building Concepts International, for 10,000 housing units to be built in the state.

Given decades of neglect of infrastructure and bad governance, the shift in human migration has posed problems for the state. Infrastructure improvements, both physical and social, have lagged behind the growth in population. There are problems in environmental sanitation, erosion control, and provision of social services. Major cities have become characterized by inadequate and deteriorated road networks and walkways, unregulated building patterns, poor sanitation, uncontrolled street trading, mountains of garbage, and chaotic transport systems, creating congestion, noise pollution, and overcrowding.

The government of Peter Obi, with the assistance of the UN-HABITAT, produced 20-year structural plans (2009–2028) for three major cities in the State: Onitsha, Nnewi and Awka – the Capital Territory, to restore urban planning and guide their growth into the future.

The plans contain policies and proposals for land use, city beautification, road infrastructure, industrial development, housing, waste disposal, water supply and health and educational facilities to turn the cities into successful urban areas that can generate employment and wealth, and provide high living standards for their residents.

Anambra became the first state in Nigeria to adopt structural plans for its cities. With effective implementation, it should systematically grow as a major economic center in Nigeria, and West Africa.

The process of urbanization is fairly contributed by population growth, immigration, migration, and infrastructure initiatives like good road, water, power, and gardens, resulting in the growth of villages into towns, town into cities and cities into metros. To have ecologically feasible development, planning requires an understanding of the growth dynamics. There is a fear that if too many people leave the villages, only the aged men and women will be left to farm. This pattern has been seen in Amesi, Akpo, and Achina towns in Aguata local government area. They have been important in the production of yam, cocoyam, and cassava through consistent agriculture, but such activities have suffered due to the out-migration of youth to the urban centres. There has been both food scarcity in the region and over-population in urban areas.

To upgrade the state capital and improve traffic, Awka, Governor Willie Obiano signed off on construction of three fly-overs between the Amawbia and Arroma end of the Enugu-Onitsha Expressway, a distance of about three kilometres within the city. Now Anambra is fully set to complete and start operations in one the best airports in Nigeria, Anambra International Airport, Umueri.

Transport 
Anambra has good transport links to other states in the country. The Niger River connects Onitsha with the ports of Port Harcourt in Rivers State, and Bururu and Warri in Delta State. Nearing completion is the Second Niger Bridge at Onitsha.

Culture and tourism 
Ogbunike Caves, listed by UNESCO as a World Heritage Site, is one of the most visited tourist sites in Anambra State. It is classified as a sandstone cave (Lateritic sandstones of Campanian-Miocene age). The Owerre Ezukala caves and waterfalls are great tourist attractions in the state. Largely unexplored, the caves are said to be the largest in West Africa.

The indigenous ethnic groups in Anambra state are the Igbo (99% of population) and small population of people who are bilingual, they live mainly in the north-western part of the state.

Igbo Ukwu Museum: Igbo Ukwu is an ancient town known for its astonishing metal crafts; it continues to attract tourists to see its bronze artifacts. First noticed in 1938, the bronzes were later excavated by Thurstan Shaw (an English archaeologist). They have been dated to the 9th century, and are of high value and historic relevance.

Anambra has diverse delicacies, ranging from spicy Chinese white soups to hamburgers, sharwarmas and onugbu soup, a famous dish from the state.

Religion 

The churches in Anambra State include Catholic, Anglican and Pentecostal. The Catholic cathedral is the Cathedral Basilica of the Most Holy Trinity, located at 13B New Nkisi Rd, GRA 434106, Onitsha. The Anglican Cathedral is All Saints Cathedral, GRA 434106, Onitsha.

Anambra State also has numerous Pentecostal churches like Assemblies of God Church, Redeemed Church, House on the Rock, Dominion City, Dunamis, Winners' Chapel, and Christ Embassy.

Education 

Anambra is known to be leading in basic education in Nigeria, especially in science and technology. In 2018, five students from Regina Pacis Model secondary school, Onitsha, won gold medals at the World Technovation Challenge, held in Silicon Valley, San Francisco.

Public tertiary institutions 

 The Nnamdi Azikiwe University (UNIZIK), Awka, which runs a modern teaching hospital in Nnewi with facilities also at Umunya, and Ukpo. There are also a faculty of pharmaceutical sciences at Agulu, a School of Preliminary studies at Mbaukwu, and a College of Agriculture.
 Chukwuemeka Odumegwu Ojukwu University, formerly known as Anambra State University, and formerly known as Anambra State University of Science and Technology (ASUTECH), with two campuses, one in Uli, and another at Igbariam
 The Federal Polytechnic, Oko
 Nwafor Orizu University of Education (formerly known as the Nwafor Orizu College of Education), Nsugbe
Federal College of Education (Technical), Umunze
Anambra State Polytechnic, formerly known Anambra State College of Agriculture, Mgbakwu

Private tertiary institutions 

 The Tansian University, Umunya
 Madonna University, Okija
 Paul University, Awka
 Legacy University, Okija
 St Peter's University, Achina with a campus at Onneh Townhttps://www.nigeriacatholicnetwork.com/peter-university-gets-approval-awka-ekwulobia-and-nnewi-dioceses-react/
 The UA College of Science & Technology Isuofia
 The University of America College of Science and Technology.
 Grundtvig Polytechnic, Oba
 Buckingham Academy of Management and Technology, Ogidi
 Onit College of Education, Mbaukwu

Awka, the state capital, is also the center of Nigeria's metalwork and carving industries.

The literacy rate in the state is comparatively high compared to other states. Anambra State students have won laurels, nationally and internationally in recent times. This is a pointer to the literacy rate of the state, when compared to others. Primary and secondary school enrollment in the state is one of the highest in the country. Consequently, Anambra state has the highest number of JAMB candidates going after the limited number of spaces in Nigeria's tertiary colleges. From 2011/2012 to 2014, its students had the best results in both WAEC and NECO-conducted senior secondary school examinations.

Anambra State has some of the best boarding and day secondary schools in Nigeria. The state places a high standard on secondary education.

Politics 
Anambra's political history can be described as varied. Until the early 21st century, it was marked by considerable unrest. Having a long list of "firsts" in Nigerian history, it has been known by the sobriquet as, "The Light of The Nation". On 29 May ,1999, Chinwoke Mbadinuju was sworn in as civilian governor of Anambra state, after many years of military rule. His administration was plagued by deep problems: the most notable was withholding of teachers' salaries in the school. The teachers finally conducted a ten-month strike in all the government secondary schools in the state.

Before Mbadinuju's rule, secondary education had been free of charge. His administration imposed a tuition fee of 3,000 Naira per term, for all secondary schools, which led to an unprecedented massive demonstration by secondary school students from all over the state. Many people attribute Mbadinuju's failure to political godfathers; his successor also struggled. On 26 May 2003, Chris Ngige was sworn in as the new governor of the state, but he was removed in March 2006 after Peter Obi of APGA filed charges against him of electoral malpractice. The Court of Appeal in Enugu asserted that Ngige's apparent victory in the 2003 election was fraudulent and ordered him to leave the seat.

Obi was ousted by a faction of the Anambra State House of Assembly on 2 November 2006 and replaced by Virginia Etiaba, his deputy. On 9 February 2007, Etiaba handed power back to Obi after the Court of Appeal had nullified Obi's removal.

On 14 April 2007, Andy Uba of PDP was "elected" as the new governor of the state and, on 29 May, was sworn in. Reported to be massively rigged, the election was widely criticised.  On 14 June 2007 the Supreme Court of Nigeria ruled that Peter Obi's tenure had not ended; therefore there was no vacancy in the governorship. It removed Andy Uba from office and replaced him with his predecessor Obi.

On 6 February 2010, Peter Obi was re-elected governor for a second term of four years, after a hot contest with Chris Ngige, a former governor of the state; Prof. Charles Soludo, a former governor of the Central Bank of Nigeria; and Andy Uba, who was a strong voice in the state's politics. Other contenders included Mrs Uche Ekwunife, Prince Nicholas Ukachukwu, and many others. Twenty-five contestants ran for the office. Obi was affirmed as the winner of the election, having more than 30% votes above the immediate runner-up. Chief Willie Obiano was sworn in on 17 March 2014 after winning the 16 November 2013 election. Governor Willie Obiano of All Progressives Grand Alliance (APGA) was sworn in for a second term in office on 17 March 2018 after the victory at 18 November 2017 elections . He handed over to Charles Soludo, winner of the November 9, 2021 gubernatorial election in Anambra state on 17 March 2022.

Electoral System

The electoral system of each state is selected using a modified two-round system. To be elected in the first round, a candidate must receive the plurality of the vote and over 25% of the vote in at least two -third of the State local government Areas. If no candidate passes threshold, a second round will be held between the top candidate and the next candidate to have received a plurality of votes in the highest number of local government areas.

Notable people 

 Professor Chinua Achebe – native of Ogidi and best known for the classic, Things Fall Apart; first African writer whose books are standard curricula in schools and universities across the world.
 Chimamanda Adichie – writer, won the Orange Prize for Fiction (2007) and a MacArthur Foundation Fellowship (2008)
 Dora Akunyili – ex-head of NAFDAC, and former (17 December 2008 – 15 December 2010) Minister of Information won international awards for cleansing Nigeria of the scourge of fake drugs
 Emeka Anyaoku – first black secretary-general of the Commonwealth and recipient of South Africa's Order of the Companions of Oliver Reginald Tambo for his role in initiating talks between the apartheid state and the African National Congress
 Cardinal Francis Arinze – once considered a potential Pope
 Ukpabi Asika – political scientist and administrator from Onitsha; East Central State administrator during and after the Nigerian Civil War
 Adaeze Atuegwu - author and disability inclusive advocate 
 Nnamdi Azikiwe Owelle of Onitsha – first president of the Federal Republic of Nigeria
 Chinwe Chukwuogo-Roy MBE – London-based artist; first black artist to paint a portrait of Queen Elizabeth II; one of the UK Women of the Year in 2002 and 2003; represented the UK at the Council of Europe; in 2009 she was made an MBE
 Chief Oliver De Coque – popular Nigerian highlife musician and guitarist
 Professor Kenneth Dike – pre-eminent scholar of African History and native of Awka; first indigenous vice-chancellor of the University of Ibadan and founder of the National Archives
 Cyprian Ekwensi – MFR, writer of international repute
 Dr. Alex Ifeanyichukwu Ekwueme – from Oko town; politician; architect; first executive vice-president of Nigeria, serving 1979–1983
 Philip Emeagwali – winner of the 1989 Gordon Bell Prize for Supercomputing
 Buchi Emecheta  Author and Sociologist
 Bonaventure Enemali – commissioner for Youth Empowerment and Creative Economy
 Professor Ben Enwonwu – native of Onitsha; first Nigerian sculptor of international repute with artwork gracing the United Nations headquarters
 Ken Erics – multi-award-winning Nollywood actor, producer, CEO of KEN ERICS Productions, writer and occasional musician
 Ezego – entrepreneur who allegedly amassed wealth through dubious and diabolical means
 Chukwuemeka Ezeife – former Governor of Anambra State and Presidential Adviser on Political Matters to President
 Flavour (Chinedu Okoli) – popular singer and songwriter

 Cletus Ibeto – industrialist and businessman from Nnewi
 Chukwuemeka Ike – writer of many books including Toads forSsupper, Bottled Leopard, and Expo 77; hails from Ndikelionwu in Anambra State; was the traditional ruler Ikelionwu XI; first registrar of the West African Examination Council
 Godwin Maduka – doctor, businessman, philanthropist, founder of Las Vegas Pain Institute and Medical Center
 Chinwoke Mbadinuju- Former Governor of Anambra State
 Hon. Ifeanyi Chudy Momah – lawyer and legislator; Honorable Member representing Ihiala in the Federal House of Representatives
 Ebube Muonso – religious leader
 Dr Chris Ngige- Former Governor of Anambra State
 Flora Nwapa Author and pioneer  Africa woman writer in Igboland
 Emeka Nwokedi – conductor and music director
 Professor Humphrey Nwobu Nwosu – professor of political science; former NEC chairma; conducted the freest, fairest and most credible election so far in Nigeria
Oseloka H. Obaze (born 1955) – diplomat, politician and author
 Professor Chike Obi – mathematician famous for his work on non-differential equations; won the 1985 ICTP Prize and developed a special solution for Fermat's Last Theorem;
 Peter Obi- Former Governor of Anambra State
 Lieutenant-General Chikadibia Isaac Obiakor – appointed as military advisor, Assistant Secretary General Office of Military Affairs, UN Office of Peacekeeping Operations, New York; previously served as commander of the Economic Community of West African States Monitoring Group (ECOMOG) Artillery Brigade in Liberia in 1996 and 1997
 Emeka Offor – chairman of Chrome Group
 Dim Emeka Ojukwu – native of Nnewi, the leader of the secessionist Biafra Republic
 Louis Odumegwu Ojukwu – native of Nnewi; first Nigerian millionaire and first president of the Nigerian Stock Exchange
 Dr. Senator Chuba Wilberforce Okadigbo (1941–2003) – native of Ogbunike; president of the Senate of Nigeria
 Professor Uche Okeke – native of Nimo; one of the foremost Nigerian fine artists; founder of the Uli movement
 Ifeoma Okoye Novelist
 Chief P.N. Okeke-Ojiudu – politician and Businessman and the first minister of agriculture in the Nigerian first republic
 Pius Okigbo, CON – world-renowned economist; first economic advisor to the Federal government of Nigeria (1960–1962); first Nigerian Ambassador to the European Community; renowned for bringing to light over $12 billion missing in oil windfall receipts from the Central Bank of Nigeria during the first Gulf War
 Amobi Okoye – youngest American football player to play for the NFL (2004), currently a free agent
 Professor Samuel Okoye – black Africa's first PhD in Radio Astronomy; with Antony Hewish of the University of Cambridge, discovered the radio source of Crab Nebula neutron star
 Chinyere Stella Okunna – first Nigerian female professor in mass communication
 Azuka Okwuosa – former Anambra State Commissioner for Works and Transport
 Azikiwe Peter Onwualu – former director general and chief executive officer of the Raw Materials Research and Development Council
 Chi Onwurah – British Labour Party politician, elected at the 2010 general election as the Member of Parliament for Newcastle-upon-Tyne Central, becoming the first female British MP of African origin
 Allen Onyema – Chairman of Air Peace
 Oscar N. Onyema – OON, chief executive officer of the Nigerian Stock Exchange and chairman of Central Securities Clearing System
 Nwafor Orizu – hails from Nnewi, Nnewi South; first Senate President of the Federal Republic of Nigeria
 Osita Osadebe – popular Nigerian highlife musician; holds the Nigerian record for the highest selling album
 Chief Stephen Osita Osadebe
P-Square (Peter and Paul Okoye) – Nigerian music duo consisting of twin brothers
 Professor Charles Chukwuma Soludo – famous economist who spearheaded Nigerian economic reform from 1999 to 2008; ex-head of the Central Bank of Nigeria
 Blessed Cyprian Michael Iwene Tansi (born in Aguleri, Anambra State, 1903 – died Leicester, England, 1964) – ordained a Roman Catholic priest of the Archdiocese of Onitsha, Nigeria; later a Cistercian monk at Mount Saint Bernard Monastery in England; Pope John Paul II beatified him in 1998
 Fabian Udekwu (1928–2006) – professor of surgery and trailblazer of open heart surgery in Africa
 Chief Jerome Udoji – from Ozubulu; social reformer; first African to be made a District Officer by the Colonial Administration
 Chuka Umunna – British Labour Party Member of Parliament for Streatham constituency

See also 
 Anam
 Uli, Anambra

References

External links 

 
 Anambra.ng portal – official information site

 
States of Nigeria
States in Igboland
States and territories established in 1991